Ulcinj Municipality (Montenegrin: Opština Ulcinj / Општина Улцињ; Albanian: Komuna e Ulqinit) is the southernmost municipality of Montenegro, bordered by Albania to the east, Bar Municipality to the north and Adriatic Sea to the south and the west. It has an area of 255 km², and a population of 19,921 as of the 2011 census. Its seat is the town of Ulcinj.

Geography and tourism
On a hilltop overlooking the shore, Ulcinj is a popular tourist destination for its Long Beach, Valdanos, Lake Šas, and Ada Bojana Island, and for its 2000-year-old Ulcinj Castle. There is also a beach called Mala Plaža (also "the City beach") which is much smaller, but is located in the centre of town and very popular with visitors.

"The Korzo", as it is called by locals, is a promenade which separates a street lined with coffee shops from Mala Plaža. On summer nights, the Korzo is closed to car traffic, and families and young people gather there. Many lesser-known smaller beaches are also near the main tourist areas.

Ulcinj has a large number of religious buildings like mosques, türbes and churches, including Pasha's Mosque, Sailors' Mosque, Church-Mosque of Ulcinj and St. Nicholas' Church. Its oldest section is a well preserved castle-style community with features that remain from medieval times.

Municipality Day

Ulcinj Municipality Day (Montenegrin: Dan opštine Ulcinj / Дан општине Улцињ, Albanian: Dita e Komunës së Ulqinit), also called Ulcinj Day (Montenegrin: Dan Ulcinja / Дан Улциња, Albanian: Dita e Ulqinit) is an annual Albanian holiday held every first Saturday of April. It has events such as the Domestic Products Fair and the Concert, which are usually held in the Rana neighbourhood.

Local administration

Local parliament

Settlements
The Municipality of Ulcinj has 41 residential areas. As of the 2011 census, the urban center, Ulcinj, had 10,707 inhabitants, or 53.75% of the municipality's population:

Demographics
Ulcinj Municipality, has the largest Albanian community in Montenegro, with an approximately 70% Albanian population. (The next largest is Tuzi Municipality, with 68%.)

Ethnicity (2011 census):
 Albanians - 14,076
 Montenegrins - 2,478
 Bosniaks - 1,219
 Serbs - 1,145
 Other - 541
 Not declared - 425

Religion (2011 census):
Muslims - 14,308
 Orthodox - 2,964
 Catholics - 2,196
 Other religions - 173
 Atheists - 53
 Not declared - 227

Gallery

References

 
Municipalities of Montenegro